Snowden may refer to:

 Snowden (surname), a given name and a family name

People
 Edward Snowden, former computer intelligence consultant who leaked highly classified information from the National Security Agency (NSA) in 2013

Music
 Snowden (band), an indie rock band from Atlanta, Georgia, US
 Snowden (EP)
 Snowden Family Band, a 19th-century singing group from Knox County, Ohio, US
 Snowden (song), a 2005 song by Doves from Some Cities

Other uses
 Snowden (film), a 2016 biographical political thriller by Oliver Stone
 Snowden (physics), a unit of X-ray emissivity
 Snowden, West Virginia, US
 Snowden (character), a character from the novel Catch-22 by Joseph Heller
 Snowden International School, a public high school in Boston, Massachusetts
 Snowden Mountain, a summit in Alaska
 Snowden, a Christmas character in Snowden on Ice

See also
 Cherax snowden, a crayfish from West Papua, Indonesia
 Snowden Crags and Snowden Carr, a prehistoric archaeological site in North Yorkshire, England
 Snowdon, the highest mountain in Wales
 Snowdon (disambiguation)